Jacques Kallis is a South African cricketer who plays as an all-rounder. He has been described as "the greatest cricketer ever", and is considered one of the best all-rounders of all time, along with Sir Garfield Sobers. He has scored 45 centuries (100 or more runs in a single innings) in Test cricket, the most by any South African, and 17 centuries in One Day International (ODI) matches. He leads all South African batsmen in runs in both Test and ODI cricket.

Kallis made his Test debut against England in December 1995. He scored his maiden Test century just over two years later, in his seventh Test match, making 101 against Australia. In the 2003–04 series against the West Indies, Kallis scored a century in each of the four Test matches, becoming the first cricketer to pass 100 in every match of a series lasting more than three Tests. His feat also marked the first time a South African player scored centuries in four consecutive Test matches, a run he extended in his next match, scoring 150 not out against New Zealand, to become the second player, after Sir Donald Bradman, to pass 100 in five consecutive Tests. Kallis passed Gary Kirsten as South Africa's leading run-scorer in Test cricket when he reached his 22nd century during the 2004–05 tour of the West Indies. His achievements during the 2004–05 and 2005 cricket seasons, during which time he scored six Test centuries, resulted in him being named as Test Player of the Year by the International Cricket Council (ICC). In October 2007 he became the fourth South African to reach 100 in both innings of a Test match when he did so against Pakistan. He scored a century in each of the following three Tests, tallying five centuries in four Test matches. In doing so, he joined Bradman, Matthew Hayden and Ken Barrington as one of just four players to have scored centuries in four consecutive Test matches on two occasions. Kallis scored his first double century in Test cricket in December 2010, scoring an unbeaten 201 in the first Test against India. Prior to his double century, Kallis had been the only player in the top 15 Test run-scorers not to have reached 200. Later during the same series, Kallis struck centuries in both innings of a match for the second time in his career, becoming the first South African to achieve the feat on two occasions. He reached his second double century, and his highest score, in 2012 against Sri Lanka, making 224.

In ODI cricket, Kallis scored his maiden century in January 1998, totalling 111 against New Zealand. He reached his highest total in ODIs against the West Indies in February 2004, scoring 139. He generally scores at slower than one run per delivery, but does score more quickly on occasions on which he reaches a century, averaging 90.24 runs per hundred balls, rather than 72.77 when he scores less than 100. His highest strike-rate when scoring a century was 117.43, achieved when he scored 128 not out against the Netherlands during the 2007 Cricket World Cup. He is the only South African to have scored over 10,000 runs in ODI cricket, while his 17 ODI centuries rank him second behind the 21 scored by Herschelle Gibbs among his countrymen.

Key

Test centuries

ODI centuries

References

External links
 Player Profile: Jacques Kallis from Cricinfo
 Player Profile: Jacques Kallis from CricketArchive

Kallis
Kallis, Jacques